Mears or Meares may refer to:

People
Ainslie Meares (1910–1986), Australian psychiatrist and authority on medical hypnotism
Anna Meares (born 1983), Australian cyclist
Ashley Mears (born 1980), American sociologist
Brian Mears (born 1932), British author and former chairman of Chelsea Football Club
Carl Mears, Senior scientist at Remote Sensing Systems
Cecil Meares (1877–1937), Irish-born English chief dog handler on the Terra Nova expedition to Antarctica
Chris Mears (baseball) (born 1978), Canadian baseball player
Chris Mears (diver) (born 1993), British diver, Olympic champion
Daniel Mears (born 1966), American criminologist
Edward Mears (1953) American Songwriter, Musician
Eleanor Mears (1917–1992), Scottish medical practitioner and campaigner
 Gunner F. J. Mears (1890–1929), World War I soldier who became a successful artist after the war
Frank Meares (1873–1952), Australian cricketer (also Frank Devenish-Meares)
Frank Mears (1880–1953), Scottish planning practitioner
Frederick Mears (1878–1939), American civil engineer
Gus Mears (1873–1912) (Henry Augustus Mears), English businessman, founder of Chelsea Football Club
Helen Farnsworth Mears (1872–1916), American artist
Henrietta Mears (1890–1963), American Christian educator
Joe Mears (1905–1966), chairman of the Football Association and Chelsea Football Club
John Meares (1756–1809), English navigator
Joseph Mears (1871–1936) (Joseph Theophilus Mears), English businessman, co-founder of Chelsea Football Club
Lee Mears (born 1979), English rugby union player
Leonard Frank Meares (1921–1993), Australian author
Martha Mears (1910–1986), American actress and radio and film singer
Michele Lee Mears (1966) American Author, Composer, Songwriter, Vocalist
Nick Mears (born 1996), American baseball player
Otto Mears (1840–1931), American builder of roads and railroads
Ray Mears (disambiguation), several people
Richard Goldsmith Meares (1780–1862), Anglo-Irish public official at the Swan River Colony
Robbie Mears, Australian rugby league footballer
Thomas Mears (1775–1832), Canadian businessman and politician
Tracey Meares, American law professor
Tyrone Mears (born 1983), Jamaican footballer with Burnley
Walter Mears (1935–2022), Pulitzer Prize-winning American journalist
A family of American racing drivers:
 Casey Mears (born 1978), NASCAR driver, son of Roger
 Rick Mears (born 1951), uncle of Casey and brother of Roger
 Roger Mears (born 1947), father of Casey and brother of Rick

Fictional characters 

 Ernie Mears, from the BBC soap opera EastEnders
 Warren Mears, from the American television series Buffy the Vampire Slayer

Places
Cape Meares, a small headland on the Pacific coast of Oregon, United States
Cape Meares, Oregon, a census-designated place in Oregon, United States
Mears, Michigan, United States, a census-designated place
Mears Ashby, a village in Northamptonshire, England
Mears Peak, mountain in Colorado
Mears Station, Virginia, an unincorporated community

Other uses 

 Mears & Co or Mears & Stainbank, British bell-founders in the 19th century
 Mears Fork, river in North Carolina, United States
 Mears Group, British housing and social care provider

See also
Meres (disambiguation)
Mear One (Kalen Ockerman, born 1971), American graffiti artist